Terphenylquinones are fungal dyes from the group of phenyl-substituted p-benzoquinones having the following general structure.

General chemical structure of terphenylquinones
Also derivatives with a central o-benzoquinone structure are known.

Biosynthesis 
The biosynthesis of terphenylquinones is carried out by dimerization of substituted oxophenylpropanoic acids (phenylpyruvic acids).

Occurrence 
Terphenylquinones are typical constituents of the Boletales.

Examples 
{|class="wikitable sortable"
!Name||Structure|| CAS-Nr.||Origin
|-
|Polyporic acid||||548-59-4||Polypore of the order Aphyllophorales, lichen Yarrumia coronata
|-
|Atromentin||||519-67-5||Paxillus atrotomentosus (Basidiomycota)
|-
|Aurantiacin||||548-32-3||Hydnellum aurantiacum (Basidiomycota)
|-
|Phlebiarubron||||7204-23-1|| Cultures of Phlebia strigosozonata and Punctularia atropurpurascens (Basidiomycota)
|-
|Spiromentin B||||121254-56-6||Tapinella atrotomentosa (Basidiomycota) and cultures of Tapinella panuoides
|}

See also 

 Thelephoric acid

References 

Quinones
Aromatic compounds